Mohammed Al-Mfarah, also known as Abu Mesamah (May 20, 1945 – January 23, 2018)  was a Saudi Arabian actor, writer, director and producer.

Career
He started his career in 1964, after the opening of Saudi TV in 1965, He participated in several TV series. He worked at the ministry of health and submitted his resignation in 1975. He performed along actors  Saad Khader and Mohammad Al-Ali.

Some acting works

Series
Al-Saknat Fe Klobna
Secretary in the House with Saad Khader
Ahtarq Al-Samah
Abo Samah Fe Fanaq Al-Samrine

Plays
Al-Mohsan (2004)
Bokor Wa kolampor

References

Riyadh newspaper

1945 births
2018 deaths
Saudi Arabian male stage actors
Saudi Arabian male television actors
People from Riyadh Province